Josef "Sepp" Stering (born 6 March 1949) is an Austrian retired footballer.

External links
 Team Stats

1949 births
Living people
Austrian footballers
Austria international footballers
Austrian Football Bundesliga players
Bundesliga players
2. Bundesliga players
FC Linz players
Grazer AK players
FC Wacker Innsbruck players
TSV 1860 Munich players
Association football midfielders
People from Voitsberg
Footballers from Styria
Austrian expatriate sportspeople in West Germany
Expatriate footballers in West Germany
Austrian expatriate footballers